Iurie is a Romanian and Moldovan given name for males. Notable people with the name include:

Iurie Arcan (born 1964), Moldovan football manager
Iurie Bolboceanu (born 1959), Moldovan politician
Iurie Ciocan (born 1971), politician and professor from the Republic of Moldova
Iurie Colesnic (born 1955), Moldovan politician
Iurie Darie (1929–2012), Romanian actor
Iurie Leancă (born 1963), Moldovan politician
Iurie Miterev (1975–2012), Moldovan footballer
Iurie Platon (born 1963), Moldovan painter and sculptor
Iurie Priganiuc (born 1978), Moldovan professional footballer
Iurie Reniţă (born 1958), Moldovan diplomat
Iurie Roşca (born 1961), Moldovan politician, president of the Christian-Democratic People's Party (CDPP) since 1994
Iurie Țap (born 1955), Moldovan politician
Iurie Țurcanu (born 1973), Moldovan politician

Romanian masculine given names